Association Sportive de Papenoo is a football club from Papenoo, Tahiti. It currently competes in the Tahiti Ligue 2,the second tier of Tahitian football.

Last seasons

References

External links
Club's Facebook page

Football clubs in Tahiti
Football clubs in French Polynesia